Čistiny is a nature reserve in the Slovak municipality of Kamenný Most. It covers an area of 17,8 ha and has a protection level of 4 on national level. The national nature reserve was declared to protect the remnants of halophyte vegetation. Čistiny is located close to the Kamenínske slanisko national nature reserve with which it creates the biggest halophilous vegetation habitat remaining in Slovakia. Until the middle of the 20th century the area was known for its Puccinellietum limosae habitat. Recent research showed no evidence of these plants anymore.

References

 

Geography of Nitra Region
Protected areas of Slovakia
2001 establishments in Slovakia
Protected areas established in 2001